John Hammond (June 14, 1814 – ?) was an American politician and farmer. He served in the Wisconsin State Assembly. Hammond was from Turtle, Wisconsin.

References 

1814 births
Year of death unknown
People from Turtle, Wisconsin
Farmers from Wisconsin
Republican Party members of the Wisconsin State Assembly